is a tank action game designed by Keiji Inafune. The game sees players take the role of various World War II tanks piloted by Nazi soldiers that have been shrunk down to miniature size in order to fight against various bugs and insects. It is part of the Guild02 series, released for the 3DS eShop in 2013.

Reception

The game received "mixed" reviews according to the review aggregation website Metacritic.

References

External links
 

Guild (video game series)
2013 video games
Level-5 (company) games
Natsume (company) games
Nintendo 3DS eShop games
Nintendo 3DS-only games
Shooter video games
Single-player video games
Tank simulation video games
Video games about insects
Video games about size change
Video games developed in Japan

World War II video games